NGC 3982, also known as UGC 6918, is an intermediate spiral galaxy approximately 68 million light-years away in the constellation Ursa Major. It was discovered by William Herschel on April 14, 1789, and misclassified as a planetary nebula. NGC 3982 is a part of the M109 Group.

At an apparent magnitude of 12.0, NGC 3982 needs a telescope to be viewed. Using small telescopes, the galaxy appears as a very faint, diffuse patch of light, with its central region appearing as a slightly brighter diffuse ball.

General
NGC 3982 is a Seyfert 2 galaxy that spans about 30,000 light-years, about one-third of the size of our Milky Way galaxy. The galaxy is receding from us at about 1,109 km/s. The galaxy is a typical spiral galaxy, similar to our Milky Way. It harbors a supermassive black hole at its core and has massive regions of star formation in the bright blue knots in the spiral arms. Supernovae are likely to be found within these regions.

NGC 3982 has a high rate of star birth within its arms, which are lined by pink star-forming regions of glowing hydrogen and newborn blue star clusters. Its bright nucleus is home to older populations of stars, which grow more densely packed toward the center. The galaxy also has active star formation in the circumnuclear region, estimated at /year. The HST image of NGC 3982 shows a mini-spiral between the circumnuclear star-forming region and the galaxy's nucleus, which could be the channel through which gas is transported to the supermassive black hole from the star-forming region.

NGC 3982 is a member of the M109 Group, a group of galaxies located in the constellation Ursa Major that may contain over 50 galaxies. The group was named after the brightest galaxy in the group, the spiral galaxy M109.

Astronomers are interested in studying this galaxy as it can help in measuring extragalactic distances. It is helpful because it possesses two tools used to estimate astronomical distances: supernovae and Cepheid variable stars.

Supernova 1998aq
In 1998, the light from a supernova in NGC 3982 (later called ) reached Earth and was discovered by British amateur astronomer Mark Armstrong. It was discovered when it had apparent magnitude 14.9, and had grown considerably brighter by two days after its initial sighting (it reached maximum magnitude 14.0).

The supernova explosion resulted from a binary system in which a white dwarf star was capturing mass from its companion star. When the white dwarf had gathered enough mass and was no longer able to support itself, the star detonated in a violent and extremely bright explosion.

Since a supernova occurs in a typical spiral galaxy (roughly) once every 100 years, astronomers have software continuously monitor high-resolution automatic survey camera images of galaxies like NGC 3982, for early detection of supernova explosions.

References

External links

Spiral Galaxy NGC 3982 @ SEDS NGC objects pages

NGC 3982 at ESA/Hubble
Circumnuclear Star Forming Activity in NGC 3982 

Intermediate spiral galaxies
M109 Group
Ursa Major (constellation)
3982
06918
037520
17890414